Zygmunt Franciszek Szczotkowski (17 September 1877 in Warsaw – 9 February 1943 in Bieżanów) was a Polish mining engineer and the first Polish manager of the Janina Coal Mine in Libiąż.

Early life 
He was the son of Stefan Wincenty Andrzej (b. 1 February 1843) in the Stefanpole manor near Riebiņi, in a family of former Inflanty landowners of Łodzia coat of arms. Stefan was a railroad civil servant and a resident of the Stefanowo residence near Włocławek and Maria Filomena, born Kolbe, born 1849 in Włocławek, died 21 February 1931 in Libiąż. As a young man, Stefan Szczotkowski supported the cause of the January Uprising, for which the Szczotkowski family was punished with the loss of their property, and Stefan himself was forced to migrate into far East of Russia. He arrived in Warsaw in 1867 and got married there. Soon after, he became ill with tuberculosis and died when his son was two years old.

Zygmunt's mother moved to her family in Włocławek where young Zygmunt started his education. Later in his life his mother decided to move back to Warsaw where 18-year-old Zygmunt finished gymnasium. After finishing the secondary school he began studying in University of Leoben's mining faculty (Austria). He graduated it in 1900. After graduating he decided to take part in an expedition to the Ural Mountains but quickly changed his mind and decided to stay in Poland.

Professional career

In January 1901 he passed an examination before the Mining Board and in 1901-1906 he worked as a supervising engineer in one of the shafts of the Niwka coal mine near Sosnowiec. From July 1906 he supervised a coal mine Saturn in Czeladź. In 1913 he resigned his position and traveled to France and Belgium to learn the latest technologies in mine rescue. He planned to build a mine rescue station in Sosnowiec. He returned to Warsaw in 1914 where he became the manager of Biuro Stacyjne Sekcji Opałowej (Station Bureau, Fuel Section) until 1919. While in Warsaw he passed the examination for a public servant. In 1919 he directed mining operations near Zawiercie.

On 1 March 1920 he became the chief engineer of Compagnie Galicienne de Mines in Libiąż and on 18 December he was also nominated as the Polish president of the one of mines of the company – Janina Coal Mine. In the interwar period he took active part in the development of the Central Industrial Region; he also cooperated closely with the former Leopold Skulski government minister for industry and trade (1919-1920), Antoni Olszewski (in 1935-1937 he was a member of Olszewski's Committee for the Investigation of National Enterprises, the so-called Statism Committee) and with a former Minister of Transport in the governments of Kazimierz Bartel and Józef Piłsudski, later to become the manager of the Trzebinia Coal Mine, Paweł Romocki. For his merits for the Polish industry, on 11 November 1937, Szczotkowski was awarded the Knight's Cross of Order of Polonia Restituta.

After the break out of World War II, from 18 September 1939 until 3 June 1940 he continued working in the mine and he was employed by the Germans as an acting manager (Treuhänder). Around that time he was arrested by the Gestapo and accused of sabotage, he was released without any charges and continued to work in the mine. In summer or autumn of 1940 he left Libiąż and joined his family who since 1 September 1939 was living in Bieżanów. He died three years later after a long illness caused by cardiovascular disease.

Notes

References

Further reading 

 L. Nieckula, Cmentarz Bieżanowski [in:] "Gazeta Dzielnicowa Dwunastka", Kraków-Bieżanów, nr 6-7/2004, p. 6
 M. Leś-Runicka, Historia kopalni węgla kamiennego Janina w Libiążu, ed. Południowy Koncern Węglowy, ZG Janina, Libiąż 2008 (no ISBN)
 W. Kwinta, Paliwo dla energetyki [in:] "Polska Energia" – magazyn informacyjny pracowników Grupy Tauron, ed. Tauron Polska Energia SA, Departament Komunikacji Rynkowej i PR, Katowice, nr 4(42)/2012, p. 26-27
 J. Zieliński, Portret pioniera [in:] "Nasze Forum" – magazyn Grupy Tauron (without ISSN), ed. Południowy Koncern Węglowy, Jaworzno, part I in nr 11(35)/2012, p. 10-11; part II in nr 1(37)/2013, p. 12-13
 J. Zieliński, Budował Janinę [in:] "Przełom" – Tygodnik Ziemi Chrzanowskiej, nr 48(1069), 5 December 2012, p. 22
 J. Z. Zieliński, K. W. Zieliński, Wpomnienie o Zygmuncie Franciszku Szczotkowskim (1877–1943) [in:] "Kwartalnik Historii Nauki i Techniki" (Quarterly Journal for the History of Science and Technology), ed. Instytut Historii Nauki Polskiej Akademii Nauk (Institute for the History of Science, Polish Academy of Sciences), Vol. 58: 2013 nr 3, pp. 129–145

Engineers from Warsaw
1877 births
1943 deaths
Recipients of the Order of Polonia Restituta
University of Leoben alumni